Hahn may refer to:

Places
Hahn (crater), on the Moon
Hahn (Holzhausen), a hill in Hesse, Germany
Hahn, Rhineland-Palatinate, a municipality in Germany
Hahn Air Base, a former frontline NATO facility near Hahn
Frankfurt–Hahn Airport
Hahn, Texas, U.S.

Businesses
The Hahn Company, a defunct American shopping center owner and developer
Hahn Air, a German airline
Hahn Group, a German industrial company
Hahn Brewery, a brewery in Sydney, Australia
Hahn Fire Apparatus, a defunct American manufacturer of fire engines and buses

People
Hahn (surname), a German surname (including a list of people with the name)
Ida, Countess von Hahn-Hahn (1805–1880), German author
von Hahn, the name of the German-Baltic-Russian noble family

Other uses
Hahn series, a mathematical formal infinite series
Hahn–Banach theorem, theory in functional analysis

See also
 
Han (disambiguation)
Hann (disambiguation)
Hahne